Muzeum Techniki w Warszawie is a museum in Warsaw, Poland. It was established in 1955.  It is located in the Palace of Culture & Science.

Exhibits include motorbikes, aeroplanes, 19th century musical boxes, and historic cars.

References

External links
 
 

Technology
Museums established in 1955
Technology museums
Science museums in Poland
1955 establishments in Poland